Tovio is a Burkinabé sportswear and equipment supplier was founded on 1994 in Ouagadougou, Burkina Faso.

Current sponsorship

Football

National teams

Club teams
 Etoile Filante Ouagadougou
 ES Bingerville 
 Victoria F.C.

Handball

National teams
 Burkina Faso

Basketball

Club teams
 Raja Casablanca B.C.
 Olympique Basketball Center

Federations
 Ministère des Sports et des Loisirs
 Union Sportive des Scolaires et Universitaires
 FIMADA

Volleyball

National teams

References

External links
Official website 

Sportswear brands
Clothing companies established in 1994

Manufacturing companies of Africa
Burkina Faso at multi-sport events